A spectator ion is an ion that exists as a reactant and a product in a chemical equation. A spectator ion can, therefore, be observed in the reaction of aqueous solutions of sodium carbonate and copper(II) sulfate but does not affect the equilibrium:

2 (aq) + (aq) + (aq) + (aq) → 2 (aq) + (aq) + (s)

The  and  ions are spectator ions since they remain unchanged on both sides of the equation. They simply "watch" the other ions react, hence the name. They are present in total ionic equations to balance the charges of the ions. In reaction stoichiometry, spectator ions are removed from a complete ionic equation to form a net ionic equation. For the above example this yields:

So: 2 (aq) + (aq) + (aq) + (aq) → 2 (aq) + (aq) + (s) (where x = spectator ion)

⇒ (aq) + (aq) → (s)

Spectator ion concentration only affects the Debye length. In contrast, potential determining ions, whose concentrations affect surface potential (by surface chemical reactions) as well the Debye length.

Net ionic equation
A net ionic equation ignores the spectator ions that were part of the original equation. Therefore, the total ionic reaction is different from the net reaction.

See also
Catalysis

Acid–base chemistry